Green Hills may refer to several places:
 Green Hills, Pennsylvania, United States
 Green Hills, New Hampshire, United States
 Green Hills, Berks County, Pennsylvania, United States
 Green Hills, Nashville, Tennessee, United States
 Green Hills Software, an embedded systems software company
 "The Green Hills of Earth", a 1947 science-fiction short story by Robert A. Heinlein
 Bonny Hills, New South Wales, Australia, originally known as Green Hills
 Stockland Green Hills, shopping centre in East Maitland, Australia

See also
 Greenhills (disambiguation)
 Green Hill (disambiguation)
 Greenhill (disambiguation)
 Pachaimalai Hills, Tamil Nadu, India (the Tamil name means "green hills")